Thompson Township, Ohio may refer to:

Thompson Township, Delaware County, Ohio
Thompson Township, Geauga County, Ohio
Thompson Township, Seneca County, Ohio

See also
Thompson Township (disambiguation)

Ohio township disambiguation pages